Lorenzo Robledo (3 July 1918 – September 2006) was a Spanish film actor, who made over 85 appearances in film between 1956 and 1982. He is a familiar face in Italian westerns, having appeared in a total of 32 Spaghetti Western films throughout the 1960s and early 1970s.

Robledo is probably best known for his roles in Sergio Leone's Spaghetti Western films of the 1960s and 1970s, portraying minor characters in the trilogy of films A Fistful of Dollars (1964), For a Few Dollars More (1965), The Good, the Bad and the Ugly (1966), and Once Upon a Time in the West in 1968. He acted in many other westerns prolifically including the tortured sheriff in Four of the Apocalypse (1975).
 
His most notable role in Leone's films (where he is more recognizable) is in For a Few Dollars More when he plays the character of a cornered enemy of the main evil villain who tortures him and murders his family before killing him.

Robledo died in September 2006 in Madrid.

Selected filmography

 Todos somos necesarios (1956)
 Manolo, guardia urbano (1956) - Cliente del bar (uncredited)
 Heroes del Aire (1958) - Soldado que bebe coñac (uncredited)
 El hincha (1958)
 Red Cross Girls (1958) - Periodista (uncredited)
 Farmacia de guardia (1958)
 Azafatas con permiso (1959) - Otro amigo de Alberto
 María de la O (1959)
 El cerro de los locos (1960) - Valentín
 Culpable (1960) - Alberto
 La reina del Tabarín (1960) - Espectador en la calle
 El príncipe encadenado (1960)
 Taxi for Tobruk (1961) - German Soldier in Desert with von Stegel (uncredited)
 El hombre del expreso de Oriente (1962)
 La venganza del Zorro (1962) - Oficial
 Tómbola (1962) - Conductor 
 Der Teppich des Grauens (1962) - Sam
 Cupido contrabandista (1962)
 L'ombra di Zorro (1962) - Capitan
 Perseo l'invincibile (1963) - Prince (uncredited)
 Plaza de oriente (1963)
 Rocío de La Mancha (1963)
 Implacable Three (1963) - Ray Logan
 Noches de Casablanca (1963)
 Pacto de silencio (1963)
 Gibraltar (1964)
 Coplan, agent secret FX 18 (1964) - Alfonso
 Crucero de verano (1964)
 Fuera de la ley (1964)
 A Fistful of Dollars (1964) - Baxter Gunman #1 (uncredited)
 Alféreces provisionales (1964) - Capitán Córdoba (uncredited)
 The Seven from Texas (1964) - Capitan
 La tumba del pistolero (1964) - Sbirro
 Rueda de sospechosos (1964) - Enrique
 Relevo para un pistolero (1964) - Dan
 Black Eagle of Santa Fe (1965) - Messenger (uncredited)
 Aventuras del Oeste (1965) - Charlie
 Los cuatreros (1965) - Kenton
 Corrida pour un espion (1965) - Cdt F24 (uncredited)
 Fall of the Mohicans (1965) - Commander
 Hands of a Gunfighter (1965) - Slim Castle
 Agent 077 From the Orient with Fury (1965) - Mike
 The Relentless Four (1965) - Comisario
 For a Few Dollars More (1965) - Tomaso, Indio's Traitor
 Z7 Operation Rembrandt (1966) - Colonello
 Cartes sur table (1966) - Commissaire Molynski (uncredited)
 Zampo y yo (1965) - Los de la oficina
 Per il gusto di uccidere (1966) - Sheriff
 For a Few Extra Dollars (1966) - Capt. Taylor
 Navajo Joe (1966) - Robledo - Member of Duncan's Gang
 The Big Gundown (1966) - Dave - Pioneer (uncredited)
 The Good, the Bad and the Ugly (1966) - Clem, Member of Angel Eyes' Gang
 Con la muerte a la espalda (1967) - Electra Agent
 Face to Face (1967) - Wallace (uncredited)
 Train for Durango (1968) - Safe Guard (uncredited)
 A Minute to Pray, a Second to Die (1968) - Bounty Hunter (uncredited)
 All'ultimo sangue (1968) - Gunman (uncredited)
 ...dai nemici mi guardo io! (1968) - Jack Garland (uncredited)
 Los que tocan el piano (1968) - Entrenador
 Uno a uno sin piedad (1968) - Bartender
 The Cats (1968)
 They Came to Rob Las Vegas (1968) - Man at Control Center (uncredited)
 The Mercenary (1968) - Officer
 Once Upon a Time in the West (1968) - 2nd Member of Cheyenne's Gang (uncredited)
 Cemetery Without Crosses (1969) - Rogers Ranch Hand (uncredited)
 El taxi de los conflictos (1969) - Policía 
 Battle of the Commandos (1969) - Pvt. Bernard Knowles
 Garringo (1969) - Deputy Sheriff Tom
 Taste of Vengeance (1969) - Bandit Leader
 A Bullet for Sandoval (1969) - Confederate Corporal (uncredited)
 The Price of Power (1969) - Brett (uncredited)
 Manos torpes (1970)
 Un par de asesinos (1970) - Deputy
 Arriva Sabata! (1970) - Man in Sheriff's Office
 Compañeros (1970) - Captain Jim
 Uccidi Django... uccidi per primo!!! (1971)
 Un aller simple (1971) - (uncredited)
 Si estás muerto, ¿por qué bailas? (1971) - McClintey
 Boulevard du Rhum (1971) - Un tireur (uncredited)
 Su le mani, cadavere! Sei in arresto (1971) - Ballor
 Long Live Your Death (1971) - Mr. Callofen (uncredited)
 La cera virgen (1972)
 La garbanza negra, que en paz descanse... (1972)
 Cerco de terror (1972) - Willy
 Un dólar de recompensa (1972) - Mathathy Johnson, Barber (uncredited)
 Dans la poussière du soleil (1972) - Swann
 Condenados a vivir (1972) - Soldier
 Sonny and Jed (1972) - Croupier (uncredited)
 Il coltello di ghiaccio (1972) - Vice-commissioner
 What Am I Doing in the Middle of a Revolution? (1972)
 Secuestro a la española (1972)
 The Scarlet Letter (1973) - Captain
 Ricco (1973)
  (1973)
 Fasthand (1973) - Jack, Hearse Driver (uncredited)
 Santo contra el doctor Muerte (1973)
 Las señoritas de mala compañía (1973) - Mozo 3
 Onofre (1974) - Comisario
 El padrino y sus ahijadas (1974) - Defensor
 Odio mi cuerpo (1974) - Cliente del Night Club
 Vacaciones sangrientas (1974)
 The White, the Yellow, and the Black (1975) - Colonel
 Four of the Apocalypse (1975) - Sheriff Being Tortured (uncredited)
 Night of the Walking Dead (1975) - Patrick
 El comisario G. en el caso del cabaret (1975)
 Con la música a otra parte (1975)
 Muerte de un quinqui (1975)
 El libro de buen amor II (1976) - Justicia
 Guerreras verdes (1976) - Guardia Civil
 Un día con Sergio (1977) - Camarero
 El espiritista (1977)
 Cabo de vara (1978) - (final film role)

References

External links
 

Spanish male film actors
Male Western (genre) film actors
Male Spaghetti Western actors
Male actors from Madrid
1918 births
2006 deaths
20th-century Spanish male actors